Sisikon is a municipality in the canton of Uri in Switzerland. It is situated on the shore of Lake Lucerne.

Geography

Of this area, 30.9% is used for agricultural purposes, while 44% is forested. Of the rest of the land, 1.2% is settled (buildings or roads) and the remainder (23.8%) is non-productive (rivers, glaciers or mountains). , 36.5% of the total land area was heavily forested, while 4.1% is covered in small trees and shrubbery. Of the agricultural land, 0.2% is used for farming or pastures, while 4.5% is used for orchards or vine crops and 26.3% is used for alpine pastures. Of the settled areas, 0.4% is covered with buildings,   0.2% is listed as parks and greenbelts and 0.6% is transportation infrastructure. Of the unproductive areas, 0.4% is unproductive standing water (ponds or lakes), 0.2% is unproductive flowing water (rivers), 7.7% is too rocky for vegetation,  and 15.5% is other unproductive land.

Spilauersee is located on an alp below Rossstock.

Demographics
, 6.8% of the population was made up of foreign nationals. Over the last 10 years the population has decreased at a rate of -2.8%. Most of the population speaks German  (96.0%), with Italian being second most common ( 1.4%) and Serbo-Croatian being third ( 1.1%).   the gender distribution of the population was 51.8% male and 48.2% female.

In the 2007 federal election the FDP party received 75% of the vote.

In Sisikon about 69.7% of the population (between age 25-64) have completed either non-mandatory upper secondary education or additional higher education (either university or a Fachhochschule).

Sisikon has an unemployment rate of 0.36%.  , there were 24 people employed in the primary economic sector and about 12 businesses involved in this sector.  11 people are employed in the secondary sector and there are 4 businesses in this sector.  90 people are employed in the tertiary sector, with 16 businesses in this sector.

The historical population is given in the following table:

Transport
Sisikon is served by the Sisikon station, situated within the municipality and on the Gotthard railway. Sisikon can be accessed by road via the Axenstrasse.

References

Municipalities of the canton of Uri
Populated places on Lake Lucerne